Barbara Carlson (June 21, 1938 – July 9, 2018) was an American politician and radio host from Minneapolis, Minnesota.

Her father, Harry Duffy, made a successful business of running the local lumber yard in Anoka, Minnesota. She was married to Minnesota Representative Arne Carlson from 1965 until they divorced in 1977. Arne Carlson was later elected Governor of Minnesota in 1991. They are the parents of two children: Tucker and Anne.  Carlson married Martin "Pete" Anderson in 1983.

Carlson, a self-described conservative, served on the Minneapolis City Council as an Independent-Republican, and later as an Independent. She ran a campaign as a candidate for mayor of Minneapolis against Sharon Sayles Belton in 1997.

Carlson was a radio talk show host on KSTP. She wrote two books, including her 1996 autobiography, This Broad's Life. She died of lung cancer on July 9, 2018, aged 80.

References

1938 births
2018 deaths
20th-century American journalists
Deaths from cancer in Minnesota
Deaths from lung cancer
Minneapolis City Council members
Minnesota Independents
Minnesota Republicans
People from Mitchell, South Dakota
Radio personalities from Minneapolis
Writers from Minneapolis
Writers from South Dakota
Women city councillors in Minnesota
20th-century American women
21st-century American women